Chitaura is a genus of grasshoppers in the subfamily Oxyinae found in tropical Asia.

Species include:
Chitaura atrata Ramme, 1941
Chitaura bivittata Ramme, 1941
Chitaura brachyptera Bolívar, 1918 - type species (Sulawesi)
Chitaura doloduo Storozhenko, 2018
Chitaura elegans Ramme, 1941
Chitaura flavolineata (Willemse, 1931)
Chitaura indica Uvarov, 1929
Chitaura linduensis Storozhenko, 2018
Chitaura lucida (Krauss, 1902)
Chitaura maculata (Willemse, 1938)
Chitaura mengkoka Ramme, 1941
Chitaura mirabilis (Carl, 1916)
Chitaura moluccensis Ramme, 1941
Chitaura ochracea Ramme, 1941
Chitaura poecila Ramme, 1941
Chitaura samanga (Carl, 1916)
Chitaura striata Willemse, 1938
Chitaura vidua (Carl, 1916)

References 

Oxyinae
Acrididae genera